Tajan (also known as Tadzhin and Tājīn) is a village in Kisom Rural District, in the Central District of Astaneh-ye Ashrafiyeh County, Gilan Province, Iran. At the 2006 census, its population was 282, in 94 families.

References 

Populated places in Astaneh-ye Ashrafiyeh County